In mathematics, a separation relation is a formal way to arrange a set of objects in an unoriented circle. It is defined as a quaternary relation  satisfying certain axioms, which is interpreted as asserting that a and c separate b from d.

Whereas a linear order endows a set with a positive end and a negative end, a separation relation forgets not only which end is which, but also where the ends are located. In this way it is a final, further weakening of the concepts of a betweenness relation and a cyclic order. There is nothing else that can be forgotten: up to the relevant sense of interdefinability, these three relations are the only nontrivial reducts of the ordered set of rational numbers.

Application
The separation may be used in showing the real projective plane is a complete space. The separation relation was described with axioms in 1898 by Giovanni Vailati.
  = 
  = 
  ⇒ ¬ 
  ∨  ∨ 
  ∧  ⇒ .

The relation of separation of points was written AC//BD by H. S. M. Coxeter in his textbook The Real Projective Plane. The axiom of continuity used is "Every monotonic sequence of points has a limit." The separation relation is used to provide definitions:
 {An} is monotonic ≡ ∀ n > 1 
 M is a limit ≡ (∀ n > 2 ) ∧ (∀ P  ⇒ ∃ n  ).

References

Order theory